Meiacanthus reticulatus, the reticulated fangblenny, is a species of combtooth blenny found in coral reefs in the western central Pacific ocean.  This species grows to a length of  SL, or from the tip of the snout to the posterior end of the last vertebra.

References

reticulatus
Fish described in 1976